Paulina ("Pauline") Jacoba van der Wildt (born 29 January 1944) is a retired Dutch swimmer who won a bronze medal in the 4 × 100 m freestyle relay at the 1964 Summer Olympics. Her teammates in that race, who clocked in at 4:12, were Toos Beumer, Erica Terpstra and Winnie van Weerdenburg.

References

1944 births
Living people
Dutch female freestyle swimmers
Olympic swimmers of the Netherlands
Swimmers at the 1964 Summer Olympics
Olympic bronze medalists for the Netherlands
Sportspeople from Schiedam
Olympic bronze medalists in swimming
Medalists at the 1964 Summer Olympics
20th-century Dutch women